Namora District is one of twelve districts of the province Cajamarca in Peru.

See also 
 Qillwaqucha
 Quyllur

References